Corbin McPherson (born September 7, 1988) is an American former professional ice hockey defenseman. He played his entire professional career with the Albany Devils of the American Hockey League (AHL). McPherson was selected by the New Jersey Devils in the third round, 87th overall, of the 2007 NHL Entry Draft.

Playing career
McPherson attended Colgate University where he played four seasons of NCAA Division I ice hockey with the Colgate Raiders. In his senior year he was named as one of the team's three captains for the 2011–12 season.

On March 20, 2012, the Albany Devils of the American Hockey League signed McPherson to an amateur tryout agreement. He played the next two seasons in Albany, posting a +16 rating to lead the team during the 2013–14 AHL season.

On July 4, 2014, the New Jersey Devils rewarded McPherson with his first NHL deal, agreeing on a one-year, two-way contract.

Following the 2015–16 season, McPherson announced his retirement from professional hockey after four seasons.

Career statistics

Awards and honours

References

External links

1988 births
Living people
People from Folsom, California
Sportspeople from Sacramento County, California
Ice hockey players from California
Albany Devils players
American men's ice hockey defensemen
Cowichan Valley Capitals players
Colgate Raiders men's ice hockey players
New Jersey Devils draft picks